The Bait, also known as Fresh Bait, is a 1995 French film directed by Bertrand Tavernier about two boys and a girl who commit a murder, with the girl acting as the "bait".

The film is based on the 1990 book of the same name by Morgan Sportès, which is in turn based on the "Valérie Subra affair", a true event that happened in 1984.

Cast
 Marie Gillain – Nathalie
 Olivier Sitruk – Eric
 Bruno Putzulu – Bruno
 Richard Berry – Alain
 Philippe Duclos – Antoine
 Marie Ravel – Karine
 Clotilde Courau – Patricia
 Christophe Odent – Laurent
 Jean-Paul Comart – Michel
 Philippe Héliès – Pierre
 Jacky Nercessian – Monsieur Tapiro 
 Alain Sarde – Philippe
 Daniel Russo – Jean-Pierre
 Philippe Torreton – Chief inspector
 François Berléand – Inspector Durieux
 François Levantal – Cop
 Jean-Louis Richard – The innkeeper

Awards
The film won the Golden Bear Award at the 45th Berlin International Film Festival.

Gillain was nominated for the César Award for Most Promising Actress.

References

External links
 
 

1995 films
French crime films
1990s French-language films
1995 crime films
Films directed by Bertrand Tavernier
Golden Bear winners
1990s French films